Predrag Rogan (born 2 August 1974) is a Serbian football manager and former player.

Career
In July 2015, Rogan took charge of Serbian League West side Mačva Šabac. He led them to promotion to the Serbian First League in the 2015–16 season. In January 2017, it was reported that Rogan parted ways with the club. He moved to Hungary the same month and joined Nebojša Vignjević as his assistant at Újpest. In January 2018, Rogan terminated his contract with the club by mutual consent. He subsequently returned to Serbia and became manager of Serbian First League side TSC Bačka Topola.

In October 2018, Rogan was appointed manager of Serbian SuperLiga club Spartak Subotica. He left the position by mutual agreement in June 2019. The same month, Rogan took over at fellow SuperLiga side Napredak Kruševac.

On 1 June 2020, he was appointed as the manager of the Nemzeti Bajnokság I club Újpest FC after Nebojša Vignjević was sacked. Újpest was ranked 10th out of 12 teams and Rogan has seven matches left to keep Újpest in the first division.

References

External links
 
 
 

Living people
1974 births
Sportspeople from Loznica
Serbian footballers
FK Loznica players
Serbian football managers
Serbian SuperLiga managers
Nemzeti Bajnokság I managers
FK Rad managers
FK Napredak Kruševac managers
FK Spartak Subotica managers
FK Zemun managers
Újpest FC managers
Serbian expatriate football managers
Serbian expatriate sportspeople in Hungary
Expatriate football managers in Hungary
Serbian expatriate sportspeople in Kuwait
Expatriate football managers in Kuwait
Association footballers not categorized by position